Devi Jagadambika Temple  or Jagadambika Temple is one of a group of about 25  temples at Khajuraho, Madhya Pradesh, India. Khajuraho is a World Heritage Site. The temples of Khajuraho were built by the rulers of the Chandela dynasty between the 10th and the 12th centuries.

Devi Jagadambika temple, in a group to the north, is one of the most finely decorated temples at Khajuraho. It is named after Jagadambika, a Hindu goddess related to devi. Three bands of carvings encircle the body of the temple. In the sanctum is an enormous image of the Goddess (Parvati).

Notes

External links
 Archaeological Survey of India, Bhopal Division, Index Page for Khajuraho - Chhatarpur 
 Archaeological Survey of India, Bhopal Division, Javari Temple, Khajuraho 
 Photo of temple
 Large photo of carvings
 Naga Queens photo
 Photo of Bhairava
 Photo Vishnu and Lakshmi
 Photos of the temple
  M.P. Tourism Website, Official Website of Madhya Pradesh State Tourism Corporation, Khajuraho

Shakti temples
World Heritage Sites in Madhya Pradesh
Bundelkhand
Hindu temples in Khajuraho